Jay Coogan is an American artist and an academic currently serving as the third President of IYRS School of Technology & Trades. Coogan most recently had served as the sixteenth president of the Minneapolis College of Art and Design (MCAD).

Coogan is a native of Massachusetts. He holds a Bachelor of Arts degree in visual arts from Brown University and a master of fine arts degree in sculpture from Hunter College, the City University of New York. Following completion of his degree at Hunter College, he served as a faculty member, dean, and provost for the Rhode Island School of Design since 1982. He was appointed the president of MCAD in 2009 and is still in this position as of 2015.

At the Rhode Island School of Design, Coogan held several positions including: professor of sculpture, dean of fine arts, and provost. He also received praise from the president of RISD who claimed he was one of the most valuable contributors to that school. Coogan's main focus coming into the MCAD as the new president was to "strengthen the College's regional connections, building new partnerships, and elevating MCAD's reputation as a leader in discovering and developing creative talent".

Aside from being president of MCAD, Coogan enjoys sculpting and has created his own personal work. Coogan's sculptural objects, installations, and functional works have been shown in solo shows at the Monique Knowlton Gallery, Lenore Gray Gallery, and Helander Gallery. His public commissions include works for the cities Cambridge, Boston, Providence, and Green Bay.

Coogan had his first solo art show in New York, at the Knowlton Gallery, where he wanted the audience to be confused with the shapes and angles he created with all his work being shown, which was created using bronze, aluminum, and steel. Coogan discusses his inspirations for creating his shapes in sculpturing, which include "Cana Street stores, in grocery stores, anthropological museums and on the beach." The New York Times wrote an article about Coogan's artwork in 1982, discussing his talent in the arts and how he has a future in it. He has chosen to pursue education and art education as a career.

References 

Living people
Artists from Massachusetts
Brown University alumni
Hunter College alumni
Rhode Island School of Design faculty
Year of birth missing (living people)